Abbas Kamandi (January 1, 1952 – May 21, 2014) was a Kurdish  singer, songwriter, poet, writer, painter and film director.

He was born in Sanandaj and was the son of Ali Kamandi.

Discography/Works

Albums
 "Glavyzh"
 "Pershang / Music Ensemble: The Kamkars"
 "Ouraman / Music Ensemble: The Kamkars"
 "Kyzhy Kurd"

Screenplays
 1. Asb (Horse)
 2. Yek Sabad Alaf (A grass basket)
 3. Parvaz Dar Ghafas (Flying in the Cage)
 4. Ersie Mame Rehim (Heritage of Mame Rehim)
 5. Ozve Jadide OPEC (New Member of OPEC)
 6. Nabarde Ramadie (Battle of Ramadie )
 7. Koche Sorkh (Red Alley)
 8. Vakil Aval (First Lawyer)
 9. Ghalam o Sheytan (Pen and Satan)
 10. Pahlavan Panbe (Panbe Champion)

Programs produced
 1. manzel nou mobarak 
 2. Puppet Show of pahlevan panbe
 3.Documentary kona havaran (Introducing the Kurdistan Fame)

Books
 1. Kurdish and Persian Poetry
 2. Poetry Collection of Mirza Shafi  
 3. The Ancient Sport of Kurdish Heroes
 4. Biography of Seyed Ali Asghar Kurdistani
 5. Hawraman
 6. Decoding the Cultural Manifestations
 7. Collection of Hejai Poetry Before Islam

References

1951 births
2014 deaths
People from Sanandaj
Kurdish singer-songwriters
Kurdish poets
Iranian Kurdish people
20th-century Iranian people
21st-century Iranian people